Radical 93 or radical cow meaning "cow" or "bulls" is one of the 34 Kangxi radicals (214 radicals total) composed of 4 strokes.

When appearing at the left side of a Chinese character, it transforms into , with the last two strokes switching their order and the last stroke becoming a rising stroke rather than a horizontal stroke.

In the Kangxi Dictionary, there are 233 characters (out of 49,030) to be found under this radical.

 is also the 79th indexing component in the Table of Indexing Chinese Character Components predominantly adopted by Simplified Chinese dictionaries published in mainland China, with  being its associated indexing component.

Evolution

Derived characters

Literature

External links

Unihan Database - U+725B

093
079